Inge Steensland (26 November 1923 – 18 September 2010) was a Norwegian resistance leader and shipping magnate. As a member of Kompani Linge, he participated in several commando raids during the German occupation of Norway, and was also part of the Invasion of Normandy in June 1944. For his efforts during the war, he was awarded the Norwegian War Cross with Sword, the highest ranking Norwegian gallantry decoration. After the war he made a fortune through his share in the shipping company Solvang, as well as real estate investments. In 2004, he received The King's Medal of Merit in silver, for his civilian work after the war. He also received the Norwegian War Medal, Defence Medal 1940–1945 and the British Distinguished Service Cross.

References

External links
Item reference HS 9/1410/8, wartime Special Operations Executive personnel file for Steensland, closed until 2024.

1923 births
2010 deaths
Norwegian resistance members
Norwegian Special Operations Executive personnel
Norwegian businesspeople in shipping
Recipients of the War Cross with Sword (Norway)
Recipients of the King's Medal of Merit in silver
Recipients of the Distinguished Service Cross (United Kingdom)